Taylor's Bay a settlement located east of Lamaline in the province of Newfoundland and Labrador. On a 1744 French map the cove was noted as Baye de Tailleur. William and Martha Bonnell, who had moved from Lamaline, are noted as the first settlers to the community.

The 1929 Grand Banks earthquake and tsunami struck this small fishing community destroying many small ships and local stores. Only five of the seventeen houses remained standing. The home of Leo Bonnell was swept across the road by the giant wave.  He was later quoted "If that's where God wanted it that's where it will stay.” The house remains on that site to this day. A relief committee was established by the Newfoundland government soon after the disaster and provided lumber and other building supplies to reconstruct and build new houses.

The local post office was closed on September 13, 1966. The population was 74 in 1956.  Its population had fallen to 13 by 1991 (out of a subdivisional remainder of 20), to 8 in 1996 (the entire 'between communities' population), and to 5 by 2001 (again, the entire remainder population of the subdivision (2G)).  The population then rose, however, by the 2006 census to 10 (again, the remainder population), and this was the same figure (10) that was reported in 2011.  The 2016 census returned, again, a population figure of 10, indicating a relatively stable population in a subdivision whose overall population is still slowly falling from its peak of several decades ago.

See also
List of communities in Newfoundland and Labrador
List of ghost towns in Newfoundland and Labrador

Populated coastal places in Canada
Ghost towns in Newfoundland and Labrador
Populated places in Newfoundland and Labrador